The Precision 16 is an American sailing dinghy that was designed by Stephen Seaton and first built in 1982.

Production
The design was built by Precision Boat Works in Palmetto, Florida, United States, starting in 1982, but it is now out of production. A total of 64 examples of the type were reported as having been completed by 1994.

Design
The Precision 16 is a recreational sailboat, built predominantly of fiberglass, with teak wood trim. It has a fractional sloop rig with aluminum spars. The double hull has a raked stem, a plumb transom and a retractable centerboard. The a transom-hung, kick-up rudder has an aluminum head that is controlled by a tiller. Both the rudder and centerboard are made from foam-cored fiberglass. The boat is open and has no foredeck, although it has two stowage compartments.

For sailing the design is equipped with a self-bailing cockpit. The mainsail boom has the mainsheet rigged for mid-boom sheeting.

The design has a Portsmouth Yardstick racing average handicap of 100.1 and is normally raced with a crew of two sailors.

Operational history
In a 1994 review Richard Sherwood noted that the boat was only sold in Florida. He also remarked on its planing capabilities.

See also
List of sailing boat types

References

Dinghies
1980s sailboat type designs
Two-person sailboats
Sailboat type designs by Stephen Seaton
Sailboat types built by Precision Boat Works